Timothy William Belk (born April 6, 1970) is a former professional first baseman who played one season for the Cincinnati Reds of Major League Baseball. He made his Major League debut on June 25, 1996, and played his final game on July 3, 1996.  He was drafted by the Reds on June 1, 1992 and signed with them on June 4, 1992. He was later traded to the Detroit Tigers on March 20, 1998, for Kevin Baez, but did not play a game. deceased on May 5th 2020

References

External links

Pura Pelota (Venezuelan Winter League)

1970 births
Living people
American expatriate baseball players in Mexico
Baseball players from Cincinnati
Chattanooga Lookouts players
Cincinnati Reds players
Indianapolis Indians players
Lubbock Christian Chaparrals baseball players
Major League Baseball first basemen
Memphis Redbirds players
Mexican League baseball first basemen
Mexican League baseball right fielders
Olmecas de Tabasco players
Tiburones de La Guaira players
American expatriate baseball players in Venezuela
Toledo Mud Hens players
Winston-Salem Spirits players
Zion Pioneerzz players